Marios Nicolaou (born March 22, 1981) is a Cypriot defender. His former teams are Olympiakos Nicosia, Nea Salamis Famagusta FC and AC Omonia where he started his career.

External links
 

1981 births
Living people
Olympiakos Nicosia players
AC Omonia players
Nea Salamis Famagusta FC players
Cypriot footballers
Cyprus international footballers
MEAP Nisou players
Association football defenders